The King River is a river in the Northern Territory of Australia. It is a tributary of the Daly River which ultimately flows into the Timor Sea.

The Dry River is a tributary of the King River.

A telemetered gauging station is located on the river downstream from the Victoria Highway crossing. The maximum recorded flood height at this station was 13.959 m on 11 March 1974. It was originally used to investigate the water resources of the Northern Territory.  It is now used as a flood warning site.

See also

List of rivers of Northern Territory

References

Rivers of the Northern Territory